Eremophila lehmanniana is a flowering plant in the figwort family, Scrophulariaceae and is endemic to Western Australia. It is an erect shrub, usually with short, wide, serrated leaves and white to lilac-coloured flowers. It occurs in the south west of Western Australia.

Description

The petal tube is white to lilac-coloured on the outside, white inside and there are pale yellow-brown spots on the lowest petal lobe. Both surfaces of the petal tube and lobes are glabrous but the inside of the tube is filled with long, soft hairs. The 4 stamens are fully enclosed in the petal tube.

Taxonomy and naming 
The species was first formally described by Otto Wilhelm Sonder in 1848 and given the name Halgania lehmanniana. The description was published in  Johann Georg Christian Lehmann's 1848 Plantae Preissianae. In 1981, Robert Chinnock changed the name to Eremophila lehmanniana. The specific epithet (lehmanniana) honours the botanist, J.G.C. Lehmann.

Distribution and habitat
Eremophila lehmanniana occurs between Esperance and Geraldton in the Avon Wheatbelt, Coolgardie, Esperance Plains, Geraldton Sandplains and Mallee biogeographic regions. It is found growing on a range of soil types, usually in open woodland.

Conservation status
This species is classified as "not threatened" by the Western Australian Government Department of Parks and Wildlife.

Use in horticulture
This eremophila is very hardy and suitable for a low maintenance garden. It is easily propagated from cuttings and grows in most soils, including clay in full sun or partial shade. It only needs an occasional watering in long droughts and will grow in humid areas like Sydney, although it does need some protection from strong winds.

References

Eudicots of Western Australia
lehmanniana
Endemic flora of Western Australia
Plants described in 1848
Taxa named by Otto Wilhelm Sonder